Below is a list of notable artistic gymnastics events held in 2018, as well as the medalists.

Calendar of events

International

Regional

FIG World Cup series

International medalists

Women's

International events

Regional events

Multi-sport events

FIG World Cup series

Men's

International events

Regional events

Multi-sport events

FIG World Cup series

Season's best international scores 
Only the scores of senior gymnasts from international events have been included below; one score per gymnast.  Finalists at the 2018 Artistic Gymnastics World Championships are highlighted in green.

Women's

All-around

Vault

Uneven bars

Balance beam

Floor exercise

Men's

All-around

Floor exercise

Pommel Horse

Still Rings

Vault

Parallel Bars

High Bar 

Artistic
Artistic gymnastics
Gymnastics by year
2018 sport-related lists